The Very Best of MC Lyte is a compilation album by MC Lyte. It was released on September 4, 2001, for Atlantic Records and Rhino Entertainment. The album featured songs from each of her studio albums except Seven & Seven.

Track listing

References

MC Lyte albums
Albums produced by Marley Marl
2001 greatest hits albums